Neon Shark vs Pegasus, also known as NEON SHARK vs Pegasus (Deluxe: Presented by Travis Barker), is a reissued album by American rapper and singer Trippie Redd in collaboration with fellow American musician Travis Barker. It was released on February 19, 2021, as the deluxe edition of Trippie's third studio album, Pegasus. The album features guest appearances from Machine Gun Kelly, Blackbear, Chino Moreno, Scarlxrd, and ZillaKami. The original version of the album (which is included) was released on October 30, 2020, retaining features from Myiah Lynnae, Yung LB, PartyNextDoor, Chris Brown, Rich the Kid, Young Thug, Future, Lil Mosey, Quavo, Busta Rhymes, Sean Kingston, Doe Boy, Lil Wayne, HoodyBaby, and Swae Lee.

Background
Trippie Redd released the album's lead and only single, "Dreamer", on his 21st birthday, June 18, 2020. Including the song, the album features fourteen new songs. However, before the deluxe version was released, it leaked on Tidal, but was taken down swiftly. It serves as the artist's first rock project, while also marking his first project that does not contain hip hop and rap in it.

Release and promotion
Trippie Redd had stated that the deluxe edition of Pegasus would be a full rock album and would be titled Neon Shark.

Track listing
Credits adapted from Tidal for both editions.

Notes
  signifies an uncredited additional producer
 "TR666" was initially released on December 26, 2017.
 All songs on the deluxe stylized in all caps.

Sample credits
 "TR666" contains samples of "A Garden of Peace" by Lonnie Liston Smith.
 "I Got You" interpolates "I Know What You Want", performed by Busta Rhymes and Mariah Carey.

Notes

References

2021 albums
Trippie Redd albums
Punk rock albums by American artists
Rock albums by American artists